Elias Seppänen (born 31 October 2003) is a Finnish racing driver currently competing in the ADAC GT Masters with MANN-FILTER Team Landgraf. He previously competed in the Formula Regional European Championship.

Career

Karting 
Born in Tammela, Seppänen started his karting career in 2014. His best result was winning the Finnish Junior Championship in the Raket class in 2016.

Lower formulae 
In 2019 Seppänen made his single-seater racing debut in the F4 South East Asia Championship. The Finnish driver won eleven races and with 617 points he finished second in the standings to Irish driver Lucca Allen. He also made two guest appearances in the SMP F4 Championship and competed in the Formula Academy Finland, where he finished third in the championship.

The next year the Finn moved over to race in the ADAC F4 Championship with US Racing. He achieved a race victory at the Lausitzring, and with nine further podiums Seppänen finished third in the standings, only behind Red Bull juniors Jak Crawford and Jonny Edgar.

Formula Renault Eurocup 
Seppänen made his debut in the Formula Renault Eurocup as a guest driver for R-ace GP in the final round of the series' history at Paul Ricard. He finished the races in 14th and eighth.

Formula Regional European Championship 
In 2021 Seppänen progressed to the Formula Regional European Championship, partnering Nico Göhler and fellow Finn Patrik Pasma at KIC Motorsport. He scored his first point in the second race of the first round of the season in Imola.

Racing record

Karting career summary

Racing career summary 

† As Seppänen was a guest driver, he was ineligible for championship points.
* Season still in progress.

Complete F4 SEA Championship results 
(key) (Races in bold indicate pole position) (Races in italics indicate fastest lap)

Complete ADAC Formula 4 Championship results
(key) (Races in bold indicate pole position) (Races in italics indicate fastest lap)

Complete Formula Regional European Championship results 
(key) (Races in bold indicate pole position) (Races in italics indicate fastest lap)

Complete ADAC GT Masters results
(key) (Races in bold indicate pole position) (Races in italics indicate fastest lap)

References

External links 
 

2003 births
Living people
Sportspeople from Helsinki
Finnish racing drivers
ADAC Formula 4 drivers
Formula Renault Eurocup drivers
Formula Regional European Championship drivers
ADAC GT Masters drivers
SMP F4 Championship drivers
SMP Racing drivers
US Racing drivers
KIC Motorsport drivers
R-ace GP drivers
Team Meritus drivers
Karting World Championship drivers
People from Tammela, Finland